The Bentley S3 is a four-door luxury car produced by Bentley from late 1962 until 1965.

The S3 was very similar to the S2, with the most-visible exterior difference being a four-headlamp layout reflecting that introduced on the Rolls-Royce Silver Cloud III the same model year. The interior was modified with individual seats for front passengers and increased leg room in the rear. The 6.2 L (6230 cc/380 in³) V8 engine continued with minor modifications. The power steering was also improved.

Prices
 Bentley S3 saloon: £6,126, over triple the British-built top of the range Jaguar Mark X £2,022 (including all taxes).
 Park Ward Continental sports saloon: £8,495, a premium of about 40% over an S3.

Production
 Bentley S3: 1286 (1 drophead coupé by Mulliner Park Ward)
 Bentley S3 long wheelbase: 32 (7 with coachbuilt bodies by James Young)
(Continental below)

Changes from S2

The S3 was first announced and displayed at the Paris Motor Show October 1962.
Exterior
 Twin paired headlamps. Stepped up wattage from 120 to 150 increasing forward visibility by at least 250 yards and giving a better spread on dipped beam
 Radiator lowered 1½ inches allowing a lower bonnet line; restyled front mudguards with separate flashing indicators (formerly incorporated in the fog and spot lights); smaller over-riders on the bumpers front and rear.
Interior
 Front passengers now sit behind a fascia brow padded for extra safety and they have individual split-bench seats; the rear seat is two inches further back with modified corners and shoulder padding.

Operating
 Lighter power steering
 More powerful engine, Horse-power increased 7 percent by employing a higher compression ratio, 9:1 instead of 8:1 and larger carburettors to give higher performance - improved acceleration and a top speed of 115 mph with no loss of economy; for the American market an engine "breather" to reduce air pollution.

S3 Continental

In 1959, Rolls-Royce acquired H. J. Mulliner & Co., coachbuilders (HJM). In 1961, HJM was merged with Park Ward, which had been in the possession of Rolls-Royce since 1939, to form Mulliner, Park Ward Ltd. (MPW). When production of the S3 Continentals commenced there were more differences than the adaption of the previous HJM design by Mulliner Park Ward: The cars were built at the former Park Ward premises in Willesden, North London.
The HJM facilities were abandoned.

The S3 Continental was strictly coachbuilt. Most bodies were of the altered HJM style, available in fixed head or drop head coupe form. Of the 328 coachbuilt S3 (Continentals included here), nearly 100 were by MPW. Again, fixed head or a drop head coupe configurations were available. The most prominent visual difference from the S2 configuration was the four canted headlights.

For the first time, this body was offered on the Rolls-Royce Silver Cloud, as well as the S3 chassis. The final S3 was delivered in 1966, when the new Rolls-Royce Silver Shadow and Bentley T-series were readily available. Like earlier Continentals, the sportier S3 bodywork was manufactured entirely from aluminium, unlike the heavier, steel bodied S3 saloon. This, combined with higher gearing and the better compression ratios made for a markedly faster car. Four-doored Continentals bodied by H. J. Mulliner were known as the "Flying Spur", although four-door Continentals by other coachbuilders are sometimes erroneously referred to as "Flying Spurs" as well; the term only correctly refers to Mulliner's versions. Another elegant four-door saloon for the S3 Continental came from James Young).

Despite being highly desirable the extremely expensive Continentals (a premium of 40-50% over the very expensive S3) sold in much smaller quantities than the S3 saloon by a factor of four.

Production

 Bentley S3 Continental: 311 (291 by Mulliner Park Ward and 20 by James Young)

Sources
Dalton, Lawrence: "Rolls-Royce - The Elegance Continues", Dalton-Watson Ltd., Publishers, London, England, 
Walker, Nick: A-Z of British Coachbuilders, 1919–1960; Bay View Books, Bideford, Devon, UK (1997),

See also
Bentley
Bentley Continental
Bentley-Talk: Exclusive Bentley Online Community

References

S3
Cars introduced in 1962
Rear-wheel-drive vehicles
Luxury vehicles
Sedans